Marcellus Baz  heads charity-based organisations in Nottingham, offering community sports facilities together with outreach to, and mentoring of, young people. In 2016, Baz was named the BBC Get Inspired Unsung Hero at the BBC Sports Personality of the Year awards for his support of young people in Nottingham, UK. The same year he also received the British Empire Medal for services to youth boxing and the community.

Baz has been interviewed about youth violence, knife crime, and UK drug culture. He also completed a TEDxYouth talk in 2018 entitled Your Tribe is Your Vibe.

Early life
Baz was born and raised in The Meadows, Nottingham. As a youth he spent a lot of his time on the streets and soon turned to selling drugs and carrying weapons. He took up boxing at a leisure centre, however hand injuries from a knife attack ended his chance at a boxing career.

Charitable work
Baz registered the Nottingham School of Boxing as a Charitable Incorporated Organisation in September 2014. It is the sister organisation of Switch Up, a Community interest company that uses its profits to facilitate sport, mentoring, counselling, education and to deliver outreach services to young people in Nottinghamshire.

In February 2022, Baz established links with Mansfield District Council to take over a former community sports hall as a boxing gym.

Awards and honours
 BBC Sports Personality of the Year Unsung Hero Award: 2016
 2016 BBC East Midlands Get Inspired Unsung Hero award
 Sport Nottinghamshire Community Champion of the Year
 British Empire Medal: 2016
 2017 UK Coaching National Community Coach of the Year
 Ambassador of UK Coaching
 2017 Community Coach of the Year, Nottingham Post Sports Awards

References 

Year of birth missing (living people)
Living people
Recipients of the British Empire Medal
1970s births
Boxing in the United Kingdom